The Longphuri people, also known as Amimi people or the Longphur Naga, are a Tibeto-Burmese ethnic group inhabiting in the Northeast Indian state of Nagaland, and the Naga Self-Administered Zone in Myanmar. In India, they are listed as a subgroup of the ethnic Yimkhiung Naga whereas in Myanmar they are considered a subgroup of the ethnic Makury Naga.

References

Naga people
Ethnic groups in Myanmar